Goodluck Joseph Ole-Medeye (born 14 March 1958) is a Tanzanian CCM politician and Member of Parliament for Arumeru West constituency since 2010. He served as the Deputy Minister of Lands, Housing and Human Settlements.

References

1958 births
Living people
Chama Cha Mapinduzi MPs
Tanzanian MPs 2010–2015
Iyunga Secondary School alumni
Galanos Secondary School alumni
University of Dar es Salaam alumni
Alumni of the University of Essex
Alumni of Aston University